Glen Downey (born October 15, 1969) is a Canadian children's author, teacher, and academic from Oakville, Ontario. His publications include more than ninety books for young people across a variety of genres that focus specifically on the development of child and adolescent literacy and numeracy. Downey is best known as the series editor of Graphic Poetry, winner of both the 2010 "Texty" Award from the Text and Academic Authors Association, and the 2011 Teachers' Choice Award for Children's Books from Learning magazine. Downey came up with the concept for Graphic Poetry as a way of making poetry engaging for 21st century readers. Several of Downey's books are for award-winning educational series developed by Rubicon Publishing. These include Boldprint, The 10, Boldprint Graphic Readers, and Boldprint Graphic Novels.

Biography 

Downey was born in Hamilton, Ontario, and from an early age took an interest in reading. Although he was routinely encouraged by teachers to read books that would challenge him, Downey's formative reading consisted almost exclusively of comic books, Choose Your Own Adventure novels, Fighting Fantasy gamebooks, and the manuals and rulebooks of fantasy and science-fiction role-playing games, specifically Dungeons and Dragons and BattleTech.
 
Downey's interest in games eventually served to direct the course of his education. He received his B.A. from McMaster University in 1991, and his M.A. a year later, writing his Masters’ Thesis on the chess problem in Lewis Carroll's Through the Looking-Glass. He earned a Ph.D. in English from the University of Victoria in 1998, expanding on his previous graduate work in examining the development of the chess motif in the Victorian novel.

After teaching at both the University of Victoria and the University of British Columbia, where he won the Ian Fairclough Prize for Teaching in 2000, Downey left to pursue a B.Ed. in English and Mathematics Education at the University of Western Ontario’s Althouse College. While in the program, he submitted the manuscript for his first book, The Fifty Fatal Flaws of Essay Writing, which Althouse published in 2002. Since then, he has held a variety of teaching and administrative positions at public and private institutions, and has taught courses in Children’s Literature and Twenty-First Century Literacies in the graduate education program at the Ontario Institute for Studies in Education.

Children’s writing 

Downey’s interest in writing for children and young adults was motivated by his own formative reading experiences. He was introduced to Rubicon by David Boyd while the two were colleagues at Appleby College. Downey’s first book for Rubicon was Games for the award-winning Boldprint series. His most prolific year to date was 2009, with 47 books published across three different series. Recent work includes the Rubicon/Oxford series, Interface, a combination of texts and online platforms designed to "help students build the skills of critical inquiry."

Works

Boldprint 

Games (2004)
Images of war (2004)
Famous Trials (2004)
Medieval Warfare (2006), with Jayn Arnold
Motorbikes (2006), with Mark Treleaven
Suspense (2007)

Timeline 

Fire Mountain (2006), illustrated by Liam Thurston
Rebel Prince (2006), illustrated by David Okum
Gladiator (2006), illustrated by Andrew Barr
Escape from East Berlin (2007), illustrated by Leo Lingas
Ice Journey (2006), illustrated by Glenn Brucker
Freedom Train (2007), illustrated by Leigh Dragoon
The Great Siege (2007), illustrated by Mike Rooth
Master Leonardo (2007), with Jayn Arnold, illustrated by Mike Rooth
Miracle Men (2007), illustrated by Anthony Brennan

The 10 

Most Remarkable Writers (2007), with Jayn Arnold
Deadliest Military Inventions (2007)
Greatest Sports Showdowns (2007)
Worst Sports Scandals (2007)
Greatest Hockey Teams (2007), with Kirsten Tenebaum
Coolest Ways to Fly (2007), with Sandie Cond
Hottest Hollywood Cars (2007), with Maria Malara
Most Extreme Jobs (2007)
Most Significant Documents (2007)
Most Unforgettable Moments in NASCAR (2007)
Most Memorable TV Moments (2007)
Smartest Animals (2007)
Most Decisive Battles (2007)

Graphic Poetry 

Paul Revere's Ride (2009), illustrated by Mike Rooth
The Eagle / The Kraken (2009), illustrated by Jeremy Bennison
The Wreck of the Edmund Fitzgerald (2009), illustrated by Jeremy Bennison
Mother to Son / Harlem Night Song (2009), illustrated by Martin Wittfooth
Same Song / Maestro (2009), illustrated by Louise Ferguson
Colonel Fazackerley Butterworth Toast (2009), illustrated by Mike Rooth
This is a Photograph of Me / Girl and Horse, 1928 (2009), Alan Cook
The March of the Dead (2009), illustrated by Mike Rooth
The Woman I Am in My Dreams / Now I See You (2009), illustrated by Daisy Chan
Southbound on the Freeway / Water Picture (2009), illustrated by Robin Joseph
The Cremation of Sam McGee (2009), illustrated by Francesco Francavilla
Life Doesn't Frighten Me / Alone (2009), illustrated by Darcy Muenchrath
The Shark / Sea-Gulls (2009), illustrated by Jeremy Bennison
The Choice / Song for an April Dusk (2009), illustrated by Jenn Manley Lee
Flight of the Roller Coaster / Lake of Bays (2009), illustrated by Gavin McCarthy
The Circle Game (2009), illustrated by Nataly Kim
What Do I Remember of the Evacuation? (2009), illustrated by Tyler Jenkins
Oranges / Ode to Family Photographs (2009), illustrated by Hilary Jenkins
I am a Canadian (2009)
Hurricane / Childhood Tracks (2009), illustrated by Bruce Roberts
I Shall Wait and Wait (2009), illustrated by Anne Marie Bourgeois

Boldprint Graphic Novels

A Goblin's Tale (2009), illustrated by Andrew Barr
Nemesis (2009), illustrated by Robert Deas
Spirits of the Mountain (2009), illustrated by Zsolt Mato
Ghost House (2009), with Jayn Arnold, illustrated by Scott Lincoln
Snake Girl (2009), illustrated by Andrew Barr
Final Voyage (2009), illustrated by John Lucas

Boldprint Graphic Readers

Party Time (2009), illustrated by Franfou
Pets Welcome (2009), illustrated by Zsolt Mato
Hanging Ten (2009), illustrated by Pascal Campion
Sir Henry and the Dragon (2009), illustrated by Jason MacKay
The Sun (2009), illustrated by Daisy Chan
Penguins on Parade (2009), illustrated by Zsolt Mato
What's the Problem? (2009), illustrated by Stephen Daymond
Shaping Up (2009), illustrated by Mike Rooth
Hoop Shot (2009), illustrated by Michelle Draycott
Fish Food (2009), illustrated by Bernard Joaquin
The Legend of Wountie (2009), illustrated by Katie Cusak
Whiz Kid (2009), illustrated by Miklos Weigert and Zsolt Mato
Now You See Me (2009), illustrated by John Lucas
Nature's Story (2009), illustrated by Ken Turner
Gobble! Gobble! (2009), illustrated by Ron Sutton
Westward Ho! (2009), illustrated by Hilary Jenkins
The Gamers (2009), illustrated by Anthony Tan and Katrina Hao
Built to Last (2009), illustrated by Bernard Joaquin
Then and Now (2009), illustrated by Francesco Francavilla
The Junkyard (2009), illustrated by Karen Roy

The 10 Discovery 

Most Outstanding Canadian Immigrants (2012), with Anita Griffith
Most Important Decisions in Canadian History (2012)
Greatest Early Civilizations (2012), with Nigel Samuel
Best Superfoods (2012)
Coolest Everyday Inventions (2012)
Most Incredible High-Tech Vehicles (2012)
Most Unforgettable Olympic Medalists (2012)
Unluckiest Teams in Sports (2012)

Remix 

Passport to Adventure (2012)
World of Wonders (2012)
Fuelling the Future (2012)

Issues 21 

Digital World (2014)
Violence in the Media (2014)
Censorship (2014)

Boldprint Inquiry 

After the Fire (2020), illustrated by Christian Amiel Miranda
Gulliver in Lilliput (2020), illustrated by Bailie Rosenlund
Orion (2020), illustrated by Chris Henderson
Community Heroes (2020)
Inspiring Kids (2020)
Animal Heroes (2020)

Other works 

The Fifty Fatal Flaws of Essay Writing (2002)
The 10 Essential Ways to Teach Students with Inquiring Minds (2008)
Legendary Tales (2010)
Interface Vol 1.2 with Carolyn Craven, Lori Lisi, et al. (2010)
Interface Vol 2.2 with Carolyn Craven, Lori Lisi, et al. (2010)
The Booksmart Detective Agency, Vol. 1 -- Into the Fire (2012)

Awards 

Downey's books have been part of series that have won the following awards:

External links 
Scholastic's The 10
Boldprint, the series
 
Review of Mother to Son/Harlem Night Song by "The Graphic Classroom"
Review of The Eagle/The Kraken at shelfabuse.com

References 

1969 births
Living people
Canadian children's writers
Writers from Hamilton, Ontario